The 1927 Tour of the Basque Country was the fourth edition of the Tour of the Basque Country cycle race and was held from 10 August to 14 August 1927. The race started in Bilbao and finished in Las Arenas. The race was won by Victor Fontan.

General classification

References

1927
Bas